Wexford Collegiate School for the Arts (commonly known as Wexford Collegiate, WCSA, Wexford CSA, Wexford or "Wex" for short), formerly and still known as Wexford Collegiate Institute (WCI) and initially known as Northwest Collegiate Institute is a public high school in Toronto, Ontario, Canada. Located in the former suburb of Scarborough, it is run and organized by the Toronto District School Board, the school officially opened to students in September 1965 by the Scarborough Board of Education and was renamed Wexford Collegiate School for the Arts in 2006 in recognition of its specialized arts programs.

The school is located in the Wexford neighbourhood of Scarborough, north of the intersection of Lawrence Avenue and Pharmacy Avenue. The motto for the school is Palman Qui Meruit Ferat which means "Let him bear the palm who has deserved it".

History
Located on Pharmacy Avenue in Scarborough, Wexford is a mid-sized, three storey secondary school. The origins began when the Scarborough Board of Education applied for accommodation for a 1200 pupil secondary school named Northwest Collegiate Institute on April 2, 1962 and took steps to acquire the 8.59 acre farm owned by the late William Henry McGuire. Meanwhile, the Board offered $200,000 to James Worrall (McGuire's son-in-law) who later accepted it.

Page & Steele was appointed architects for the Northwest C.I. project and the contract for removal of buildings on the McGuire site was awarded for $1800.

On March 18, 1963, Northwest C.I. was given the official name, Wexford Collegiate Institute. The next month, the contract for construction of school awarded to Noren Construction for $1,870,220.18 with the application for funds for $2,232,000.00. The board appointed Lorne Shewfelt as the principal and Al Kerr in the Vice Principal position effective September 1, 1964. Work began on the Wexford school on July 2, 1964.

Wexford Collegiate opened for classes on September 7, 1965 as Scarborough's thirteenth collegiate institute only with the classrooms that were completed which on the upper floors. Other rooms such as home economics, industrial arts, science labs, music rooms, gymnasia, library and cafeteria are eventually completed and become available for use. The school officially opened on February 4, 1966 and the datestone ("1964") officially inserted into position in the front foyer on April 1 of that year.

In 1972 a large new wing was built in the north parking lot and opened at the north end of the school, which housed the new Art Centre, as well as a new gym and library. The new wing also included an elevator, making it one of the accessible schools within the TDSB system. By 1977, the 25 metre tank swimming pool was added.

Along with instructing the regular, core program leading to an OSSD, the school also consists of two art programs, known as the Performing Arts program and the Visual Arts program. Each program is further divided into more pathways, which is distinguished through the courses taken by the student. The encouraged growth of the Music Theatre Program in the 1990s and the continuing success of the Art Centre resulted in the declaration of the school as Wexford Collegiate School For The Arts in 2000. This designation was sought after by the then principal Gail Darling, who fought fiercely in the board administration for this permanent stature for the school.

Wexford Collegiate Institute celebrated its 50th anniversary on October 3, 2015.

Admissions
For students that geographically reside in Wexford's catchment area, the general TDSB admission policies apply for the regular academic program. Feeder elementary schools include Maryvale Public School, Buchanan Public School, George Peck Public school and Wexford Public School. Students, including local community students, wishing to enroll in one of the two Specialized Arts Programs must successfully participate in an audition process in order to be offered a position in one of these Programs.

Programs

Visual and Media Arts Program

Wexford has had a specialized Visual Arts Program for over forty years. All visual arts courses taken at the school are done in one of the classrooms located in The Art Centre. The Art Centre consists of nine studios, each specifically equipped to deliver a specialized course. One of these courses is the Life Drawing course, for which Wexford is the only secondary public school in Toronto offering the course.

For students in the Special Series and Media Arts Program (more commonly known as the "Visual Arts program"), a choice can be made at the end of grade ten where students can either earn the Grand Masters Certificate or the Visual Arts Certificate. For students earning the Grand Masters Certificate, they must take four art credits in both grade eleven and twelve, meaning half of their schedule consists of art credits. For students wishing for the Visual Arts Certificate, they must take 2 art credits in both grade eleven in twelve.

For students who have graduated from Wexford but would like to construct a portfolio as a part of their college, university or career application, they can apply for the Portfolio Year, where they will spend half to a full year constructing their portfolio with the assistance of the art teachers.

Each year, the Special Series Visual Art Program staff and students put on an original exhibit known as, The Great Masters Art Show. It typically takes place during the month of May, and is open to the public free of admission.

Performing Arts
If accepted after participating in the audition process, students will be placed either in the Music Theatre program or the Drama Focus program.

Music Theatre

Music Theatre students will take a Music Theatre course as well as a course either in Drama, Vocal or Dance, depending on where they are placed.

The Music Theatre program holds strong ties to the film, television and theatre community in Toronto. Workshops are frequently conducted between these artists and students.

These ties to the professional community have also given professional opportunities to some Wexford students in film, television, musical theatre and radio jingles. In the 1990s, Wexford established a great relationship between the Music Theatre students and the Hospital for Sick Children's Telethon produced by CFTO. The students were invited back for a seventh year in 1997. In 1993 they had four "spots" on the telethon, including the final number which they shared with Colm Wilkinson (The Phantom) and Michael Burgess (Les Miz, Man of La Mancha). The Music Theatre students also performed in a video with Donny Osmond (Joseph and the Amazing Technicolor Dream Coat) and in 1994 shared the stage with Micheal Bell (Show Boat).

In addition, the students have performed live both on CBC and CTV networks; live on stage at the New Yorker Theatre; recorded the original song "Keep the Spirit Alive" for the special Olympics; performed at the Celebrity Sports Auction; performed with Robert Pilon at Casa Loma for CEO's from all over the world;  performed along with the Leahy's and Andre Philipe Gagnon; entertained 5,000 representatives from all over North America at the Metro Convention Centre; and, appeared along with the cast of Rent at Mel and Marilyn Lastman's Inaugural Ball. In 2011, the Wexford Glee Club, known as "The Wexford Gleeks" won the first ever Show Choir Canada National Championship.  In 2012, the Wexford Gleeks placed second in the SCC Nationals, but were the audience favourite as the only choir to receive two standing ovations during the competition. In 2013, the Wexford Gleeks placed 2nd once again in the SCC Nationals, but won eight out of the ten awards that were given to individual choirs and choir members. In February 2013, the Wexford Gleeks recorded a song with an extraterrestrial Chris Hadfield and Ed Robertson of the Barenaked Ladies. Hadfield, astronaut and amateur musician, was circling the earth on the International Space Station at the time of the recording.

At the end of each school year, a musical is put together by the students and staff of the Music Theatre program.

Drama Focus 

Drama Focus students will take a course of their choice either in Vocal, Dance or in Instruments in addition to their required Drama Course. Drama Focus students and staff put together a showcase in the Fall during each school year.

Comprehensive Arts
In addition to the Performing and Visual Arts programs, students who have gone through either audition process may be placed in the Comprehensive Arts program. This program allows students to take two, as opposed to one, art credit beginning in grade nine. These credits, however, are not specialized credits like those found in the Performing and Visual Arts programs. These credits are regular credits taken by students who attend the school but are not a part of either programs.

Notable alumni

 Kawa Ada — actor and playwright 
 Shamier Anderson — actor, Wynonna Earp (TV series) 
 Shary Boyle — visual artist, represented Canada at the 2013 Venice Biennale
 Wayne Dillon — former National Hockey League player
 Nina Dobrev — actress, Vampire Diaries 
 Fefe Dobson — Juno Award-nominated recording artist.
 Filip Geljo - actor, Avatar: The Way of Water.
 Jahmil French — actor, Degrassi: the Next Generation.
 Warren Hudson — retired CFL player
 Lamar Johnson — actor
 Dan Kearns — retired CFL player
 Steve Kearns — retired CFL player
 Jamaal Magloire — retired NBA player (Grades 9 and 10 only, graduated from Eastern Commerce Collegiate Institute) 
 Kristine Sa — singer/songwriter
 Rajiv Surendra — visual artist and actor, Mean Girls.
 Brent Townsend — wildlife artist, designer of the Royal Canadian Mint's "toonie".
 Torri Webster — actress, Life with Boys

See also 
 List of high schools in Ontario

References

External links 
 
 TDSB Profile

High schools in Toronto
Schools in the TDSB
Educational institutions established in 1965
1965 establishments in Ontario
Education in Scarborough, Toronto